Gill Patti is a village falls under the tehsil and district Bathinda of Punjab, India. It is located on the Bathinda-Kotkapura road between Goniana and Bathinda.

Geography 

Gill Patti is located at  only 6 km from Goniana, 7 km from Bathinda and 225 km (approximately) from the state capital of Chandigarh. It has the total area of 883 hectares. Bhokhra (3 km), Joga Nand (4 km), Nehian Wala (5 km) and Sivian (5 km) are the surrounding villages.

Demographics 

In 2001, according to the census, the village had the total population of 2,957 with 529 households, 1,618 males and 1,339 females and thus has a sex ratio of 828 females per thousand males.

Punjabi is the mother tongue as well as official language of the village.

References 

Villages in Bathinda district